The Munduruku are an indigenous people of Brazil.

Munduruku may also refer to:

Munduruku language
Munduruku bicoloratum, a tarantula species